Berta Emīlija Vesmane (10 October 1878 – 16 June 1941) was a Latvian politician. In 1920 she was one of the six women elected to the Constitutional Assembly, Latvia's first female parliamentarians.

Biography
Vesmane was born Berta Krisone in Riga in 1878. She completed courses in commerce in Saint Petersburg, and married Frīdrihs Vesmanis, who later became the first Speaker of the Saeima. She was a member of the revolutionary movement and was arrested several times. She also served as a trade union official in the Jelgava area.

In 1920 she was elected to the Constitutional Assembly as a representative of the Latvian Social Democratic Workers' Party, serving until 1922. She and Frīdrihs were arrested in 1941. She was seriously ill at the time and died on a train while at Krustpils Station.

References

1878 births
People from Riga
Latvian trade unionists
20th-century Latvian women politicians
Deputies of the Constitutional Assembly of Latvia
Latvian Social Democratic Workers' Party politicians
1941 deaths
Revolutionaries from the Russian Empire